Nick Pinkney (born 6 December 1970) is an English former professional rugby league footballer who played as a er and stand-off in the 1980s, 1990s and 2000s. He played at representative level for England, and at club level for Ryedale-York, the Keighley Cougars, the Sheffield Eagles, Halifax, the Salford City Reds and the Hull Kingston Rovers.

Career

Club career
Pinkney started his professional career at Ryedale-York, scoring a try on his debut against Chorley Borough in November 1989. He was signed by Keighley Cougars in 1993 for a fee of £40,000. While at the Keighley Cougars, Pinkney scored over 100 tries, and broke the club record for most tries in a season twice in consecutive seasons. In 1997, he joined Sheffield Eagles. Pinkney played and scored a try in Sheffield Eagles' 17–8 victory over Wigan in the 1998 Challenge Cup Final at Wembley Stadium, London on Saturday 2 May 1998.

In May 2000, Pinkney scored his 200th career try in a 20–38 defeat against Halifax.

Representative career
Nick Pinkney was an England international and played at the 1995 Rugby League World Cup. He was selected for England in the 1995 World Cup Final on the reserve bench but did not play as Australia won the match and retained the Cup.

References

External links
(archived by web.archive.org) Profile at sheffieldeagles.com

1970 births
Living people
England national rugby league team players
English rugby league players
Halifax R.L.F.C. players
Hull Kingston Rovers players
Keighley Cougars players
Rugby league wingers
Salford Red Devils players
Sheffield Eagles players
York Wasps players